Sing Something Simple was a half-hour radio programme, which featured Cliff Adams and The Cliff Adams Singers, with Jack Emblow on accordion. The programme ran for 42 years from 1959 until 2001, initially on the BBC Light Programme and later on BBC Radio 2, and earning itself the title of the longest-running continuous music programme in the world.

Format
The lyrics to its main theme began as follows:

Sing something simple
As cares go by
Sing something simple
Just you and I

When Sing Something Simple was broadcast by Radio 2, this song would be followed by an announcer (in latter years, Alan Dedicoat) who would say:

"We invite you to Sing Something Simple, a collection of favourite songs, old and new, sung by The Cliff Adams Singers, accompanied by Jack Emblow."

and alternately 'We invite you to Sing Something Simple, not only listening, but joining in we hope, with all these songs you know so well'.

The pianist, Semprini, introduced his own show with "Old ones, new ones, loved ones, neglected ones" but the effect was similar on "Sing Something Simple".

The tune would then continue:

We'll sing the old songs 
like you used to do,
We'll sing something simple for you, 
something for you.

Ten minutes in, Cliff Adams would perform a piano solo, which he would introduce, after which the singers would continue with a selection of popular songs of varying vintage.

In the sixties it was broadcast at 7pm. following on from 'Pick of the Pops' introduced by Alan Freeman.

In later years - particularly in the 1980s - in the days when Radio 2's FM frequencies were sometimes leased to Radio 1, the programme would be broadcast directly before the Top 40.

End
The last broadcast was on 25 November 2001. The programme ended partly because Cliff Adams died that year and partly because of Radio 2's repositioning to appeal to the former Radio 1 audience.

References

External links
Theme tune
Sing Something Simple at The Cockpit Theatre

British music radio programmes
1959 radio programme debuts
2001 radio programme endings
BBC Light Programme programmes